Resurrection is the debut album by the American heavy metal band Halford, released in 2000. It was recorded over the span of almost two years, from August 1998 to June 2000. The album marks the return of Rob Halford's heavy metal roots after several years of musical experimentation. It features the song "The One You Love to Hate", a duet with metal band Iron Maiden vocalist Bruce Dickinson. "Silent Screams" is a re-recorded song that was originally demoed by Halford's previous band 2wo.

In 2006, Resurrection was remastered and re-released with an expanded (adding outtakes from the original sessions) track list on iTunes, and later on CD in 2009.

Critical reception 

In September 2003, Resurrection was ranked number 54 on a list of "The Top 100 Heavy Metal Albums" by online magazine Metal-Rules.com. In 2005, Resurrection was ranked number 320 in Rock Hard magazine's book The 500 Greatest Rock & Metal Albums of All Time.

Track listing

2006 track listing

Personnel 

Halford
 Rob Halford – vocals
 Patrick Lachman – guitar
 Mike Chlasciak – guitar
 Ray Riendeau – bass
Bobby Jarzombek – drums

Additional performers
Roy Z – guitar
Bruce Dickinson – additional lead vocals on "The One You Love to Hate"
Pete Parada – drums on "The One You Love to Hate"
Ed Roth – keyboards on "Twist" and "Silent Screams"

Production
Produced by Roy Z
Executive producer/A&R – John Baxter
Drums recorded by Billy Bowers, assisted by Mike Terry
Guitars, bass, and other instrumentation recorded by Joe Floyd and Roy Z, with digital editing by Richard "The Guru" Carrette
Vocals and additional instrumentation recorded by Bill Cooper and Attie Bauw
Mixed by Attie Bauw and Charlie Baurfeind
Mastered by Tom Baker (2006 edition)
Photography by John Eder and Fin Costello
Art and design by Marc Sasso (2009 CD release)

References 

2000 debut albums
Halford (band) albums
Albums produced by Roy Z